Colo-Colo Femenino is a Chilean women's football club from Santiago representing Colo-Colo in the Chilean women's championship. It was founded in 2007.

Colo-Colo has won the championship, which is played in the Apertura and Clausura system, nine times from 2010 to 2014. They are Chilean record champions.

In 2011, it reached the Copa Libertadores's final in its debut in the competition, beating 4-1 Caracas FC in the semifinals before losing 0–1 to host São José EC. The next year they won the Copa Libertadores on penalties against Foz Cataratas to be the first non-Brazilian champions of the tournament.

Players

Current squad
as of 25 Feb 2023

Notable players

References

Colo-Colo
Sport in Santiago
2007 establishments in Chile